The 1940 Humboldt State Lumberjacks football team represented Humboldt State College during the 1940 college football season. They competed as an independent.

The 1940 Lumberjacks were led by head coach Herbert L. Hart in his third, and last season as head coach at Humboldt State. They played home games at Albee Stadium in Eureka, California. Humboldt State finished with a record of three wins and four losses (3–4). The Lumberjacks were outscored by their opponents 33–60 for the season.

In three years under coach Hart the Lumberjacks compiled a record of 12–8.

Schedule

Notes

References

Humboldt State
Humboldt State Lumberjacks football seasons
Humboldt State Lumberjacks football